Leśniewo may refer to the following places:
Leśniewo, Greater Poland Voivodeship (west-central Poland)
Leśniewo, Maków County in Masovian Voivodeship (east-central Poland)
Leśniewo, Ostrów Mazowiecka County in Masovian Voivodeship (east-central Poland)
Leśniewo, Pomeranian Voivodeship (north Poland)
Leśniewo, Warmian-Masurian Voivodeship (north Poland)